Nouvelle Matmata is a town and commune in the Gabès Governorate, Tunisia. As of 2004 it had a population of 6,642.

See also
List of cities in Tunisia

References

Populated places in Gabès Governorate
Communes of Tunisia
Tunisia geography articles needing translation from French Wikipedia